Gürsu is a town and district of Bursa Province of Turkey.

Gürsu may also refer to:

 Gürsu, Çameli
 Gürsu, Kaş, village in Antalya Province, Turkey
 Gürsu, Sandıklı, village in Afyonkarahisar Province, Turkey
 Gürsu, Taşova, village in Amasya Province, Turkey
 Müjdat Gürsu, Turkish footballer

Turkish-language surnames